Mara is a Kuki-Chin language spoken by Mara people, mostly the Tlosaih tribe living in 30 villages of Chhimtuipui district, southern Mizoram, India and the adjacent villages in Burma.

The Mara (Tlosaih) languages belong to the Kuki-Chin branch of the Sino-Tibetan language family. The speakers of the languages are also known as Mara (Tlosais).

Mara is a recognised language in the Mara Autonomous District Council (MADC) school curriculum. Mara is a compulsory subject for all schools up to class VII (middle school) under the Board of School Education, MADC.

Demographics
Population: 56,574 in Saiha district, Mizoram, India (2011), 37,000 in Burma (2007).
Region: Saiha District, Mizoram (India), Indo-Burma Border
Alternate names: Lakher, Mara, Maram, Mira, Zao, Shendu, Khawngsai, Khyeng.
Languages: Tlôsaih, Sizo (Chapi/Saby/Ngiaphia), Hlaipao (Vahapi, Heima and Lelai), Lyvaw (Nohro & Notlia), Lochei ochebi, Zophei (Ahnai/Vytu, Bawipa and Asah/Leita),  Senthang (Khuapi/Saith a), Lautu (Awhsa/Kahno) & Saté
Tribes: Zophei, Lautu, Senthang, Tlosai, Hlaipao and Haw Thai

Phonology

Consonants 

 A glottal stop [ʔ] may occur in onsets as a result of morphological combinations.
 /t/ can be dental as [t̪] before /ɑ/ or /i/.
 /k/ can also be heard as uvular [q] before /ɑ/ or /i/.
 /s, z/ when preceding /i/ can be heard as alveolo-palatal [ɕ, ʑ].
 Pre-aspiration can also be heard among nasals as [ʱm, ʱn].

Vowels 

 Sounds /o/ and /ɑ̝/ can be heard in free variation as [ɔ, ɐʊ] and [ʌ].

Orthography
Mara alphabet (capital letters): A, AW, Y, B, CH, D, E, F, H, I, K, L, M, N, NG, O, Ô, P, R, S, T, U, V, Z

Mara alphabet (lowercase letters): a, aw, y, b, ch, d, e, f, h, i, k, l, m, n, ng, o, ô, p, r, s, t, u, v, z

Mara diphthongs: ao, yu, ai, ei, ia, ie, ua

Grammar

Plurals
The plural form of a noun is formed by affixing one of the following terms to the end of the noun:




Today the Mara language has its own alphabet; words inside brackets show author N.E. Parry's transliterations from 1937.

Interrogative words in Mara

Pronouns

Singular
1st person: ,  - I
2nd person: ,  - you
3rd person: ,  or  - he, she, it
Plural
1st person:  - we
2nd person:  - you
3rd person:  - they

Possessive Pronouns
Singular
 - my
 - mine
 - thy (you)
 - thine (yours)
 - him, her, it
 - his, hers, its

Plural
 - our
 - ours
 - your
 - anyone
 - someone, a certain one
 - another, others
 - all

References

External links

Maraland: The Home of the Maras on the internet
A grammar and dictionary of the Lakher language, by Fred W. Savidge (1908) (Scanned at Internet Archive)

Kuki-Chin languages
Languages of Mizoram
Endangered languages of India